The Redoutable was a  74-gun ship of the line of the French Navy. She took part in the battles of the French Revolutionary Wars in the Brest squadron, served in the Caribbean in 1803, and duelled with  during the Battle of Trafalgar, killing Vice Admiral Horatio Nelson during the action. She sank in the storm that followed the battle.

Built as Suffren, the ship was commissioned in the Brest squadron of the French fleet. After her crew took part in the Quibéron mutinies, she was renamed to Redoutable. She took part in the Croisière du Grand Hiver, the Battle of Groix, and the Expédition d'Irlande. At the Peace of Amiens, Redoutable was sent to the Caribbean for the Saint-Domingue expedition, ferrying troops to Guadeloupe and Haiti.

Later, she served in the fleet under Vice-admiral Villeneuve, and took part in the Trafalgar Campaign. At the Battle of Trafalgar, Redoutable rushed to cover the flagship  when the ship following her failed to maintain the line. She tried in vain to stop Nelson's HMS Victory from breaking the line and raking Bucentaure, and then engaged her with furious cannon and small arms fire that silenced the British flagship and killed Nelson. As her crew prepared to board Victory,  raked her with grapeshot, killing or maiming most of her crew. Redoutable continued to fight until she was in danger of sinking before striking her colours. She foundered in the storm of 22 October 1805.

Career
The ship of the line was laid down at Brest in January 1790, and launched as Suffren on 31 May 1791. She was the first ship of the French Navy named in honour of Vice-admiral Suffren de Saint Tropez, who had died a hero of the American War of Independence on 8 December 1788. She was completed there in December 1792.

Quibéron mutinies 
Suffren was attached to the Brest fleet under Vice-admiral de Grimouard, later replaced by Morard de Galles. Under Captain Obet, she departed Brest in 1793 for a cruise to Quibéron. In September, the crews of the fleet revolted in the Quibéron mutinies, including the crew of Suffren. In retaliation, Suffren was renamed Redoutable on 20 May 1795. The same day, she received the new naval flag of the Republic, the full tricolour which replaced the white flag with a tricolour canton, and hoisted her.

Service in Brest 
From March to June 1794 under Captain Dorré, she was the flagship of the naval station of Cancale. She comprised the Cancale division together with her sister ship , under Captain Monnier.

In December, she took part in the Croisière du Grand Hiver under Captain Moncousu; upon departure, she broke her cables, but unlike the ill-fated Républicain, she managed to reach the open sea, followed by the frigate . However, the damage sustained in the incident forced her to cancel her departure, and she returned to Brest.

In February 1795, Redoutable was the flagship of a division under Rear Admiral Kerguelen within the fleet of Brest, under Villaret-Joyeuse. Still under Captain Moncousu and with Commander Bourayne as first officer, she took part in the Battle of Groix on 23 June 1795, where her poor sailing properties compelled the frigate , under Captain Bergeret, to take her in tow. During the battle, she was one of the few ships of observe Villaret-Joyeuse's orders to support Alexandre. Later, along with Tigre, she attempted to support Formidable, but to no avail as Formidables tops caught fire and she ceased all resistance to save herself, eventually striking her colours. After the battle, she sailed back to Port-Louis, near Lorient,

In December 1796, Redoutable took part in the Expédition d'Irlande under Moncousu, by then promoted to rear admiral, and was the first French ship to reach Bantry Bay, after rallying elements of the French fleet.

Service in the Caribbean 
In March 1802, the Redoutable was the flagship of a squadron of two ships of the line and four frigates under Admiral Bouvet sent to reinforce Guadeloupe in 1802 and in the Saint-Domingue expedition in 1803, departing on 9 January from Ajaccio with troops and arriving on 4 February.

In 1803, Redoutable, under Captain Siméon, was part of a naval division under Rear Admiral Bedout, based in Saint-Domingue.

Battle of Trafalgar 

At the Battle of Trafalgar, on 21 October 1805, Redoutable was commanded by Captain Lucas, with Lieutenant Dupotet as first officer. Redoutable was the third ship behind the flagship  in the French line, coming behind Maistral's  and José Quevedo's . When Neptune and San Leandro dropped behind Bucentaure, exposing her stern, Redoutable rushed to cover her and prevent Vice Admiral Horatio Nelson's  from cutting the Franco-Spanish line of battle.

With her bowsprit almost touching Bucentaure stern, Redoutable fired on Victorys rigging for ten minutes, trying to disable her to prevent the crossing of the French line, but did not manage to stop her advance, despite cutting off her foremast tops, her mizzen and her main topgallant, and ended up running afoul of her. A furious, fifteen-minute musket duel erupted between the two ships; the crew of Redoutable had been especially trained by Lucas for such an occasion, and soon the heavy hand grenade and small-arms fire on Victorys quarterdeck mortally wounded Vice Admiral Nelson. Lucas later reported:

{{blockquote|a violent small-arms exchange ensued (...); our fire became so superior that within fifteen minutes, we had silenced that of Victory; (...) her castles were covered with dead and wounded, and admiral Nelson was killed by our gunfire. Almost at once, the castles of the enemy ship were evacuated and Victory completely ceased fighting us; but boarding her proved difficult because (...) of her elevated third battery. I ordered the rigging of the great yard be cut and that it be carried to serve as a bridge.<ref group=Note>il s’engagea un vif combat de mousqueterie [...] ; notre feu devint tellement supérieur qu’en moins de quinze minutes, nous fîmes taire celui du Victory ; [...] ses gaillards furent jonchés de morts et de blessés, et l’amiral Nelson fut tué par le feu de notre mousqueterie. Presqu’aussitôt, les gaillards du vaisseau ennemi furent évacués et le Victory cessa absolument de nous combattre ; mais il était difficile de passer à son bord à cause [...] de la supériorité de l’élévation de sa troisième batterie. J’ordonnai de couper les suspentes de la grande vergue et de l’amener pour nous servir de pont.Précis des événemens Particuliers survenus à chaque vaisseau français, dans le combat du 29 vendémiaire an 14, Report of Captain Lucas, commanding the ship Redoutable, to Navy Minister Decrès, written at Reading in England, 2 January 1806. Sources : Archives nationales, fond Marine, BB4-237.</ref>}}

The French crew were about to board Victory when  managed to come to the rescue of the stricken flagship, firing on the exposed French crew at point blank range, killing or wounding 200 men, including Lucas and Dupotet, struck by a bullet to the knee, who nevertheless remained at their stations. The crew of Redoutable rushed to man her artillery and engage Temeraire with her starboard battery, Soon,  took a position at stern of Redoutable, which thus found herself fired upon from three larger ships. In the ensuing cannonade, Redoutable lost most of her artillery, including two guns that burst, killing several gunners. Temeraire hailed for Redoutable to surrender, but Lucas had volley of musketry fired for replies.

At 1.55 pm, Redoutable, with Lucas severely wounded, and only 99 men still fit out of 643 (300 dead and 222 severely wounded), was essentially defenceless. The Fougueux attempted to come to her aid but came afoul of Temeraire. After ascertaining that Redoutable was too damaged to survive the aftermath of the battle, and  worried that she would sink before his wounded could be evacuated,  Lucas struck his colours at 2:30. Redoutables aft featured a large opening and was in danger of collapsing, her rudder was shot off, and the hull was pierced in many spots.

The next day, Redoutable made distress signals, and Swiftsure launched boats to evacuate her passengers; she foundered around 7, taking 196 men with her.Guérin, vol.6, p.438 Lucas reported:Victory had sustained 160 casualties, and Temeraire 120. Of Redoutables crew, 169 were taken on board Swiftsure''; the wounded were sent to Cadiz on a cartel, and 35 men were taken prisoner to England.

Lucas was received in England with great courtesy. After his release from capture, he was personally awarded the rank of Commandeur of the Legion of Honour by Napoleon for his role during the battle.

Notes and references

Notes

References

Bibliography
 
 
 
 
 
 
 
 Fonds Marine. Campagnes (opérations ; divisions et stations navales ; missions diverses). Inventaire de la sous-série Marine BB4. Tome premier : BB4 1 à 482 (1790–1826)

External links 

 The Redoutable at Trafalgar, report of captain Lucas
 The French Navy and the Struggle for Revolutionary Authority: The Mutiny of the Brest Fleet in 1793, William S. Cormack, Canadian journal of History

Ships of the line of the French Navy
Téméraire-class ships of the line
Shipwrecks in the Atlantic Ocean
1791 ships
Maritime incidents in 1805
Captured ships
Napoleonic-era ships
Ships built in France